Basharat Ahmad (1876– 1943), a member of the Lahore Ahmadiyya Movement, was the author of numerous publications about Islam and the Ahmadiyya movement. He was the father of Naseer Ahmad Faruqui and the father in law of Maulana Mohammad Ali.

Basharat Ahmad was born in Dharamsala, India, where he received his early education. He then studied at the King Edward Medical College, Lahore. He served as a doctor in East Africa as well as various cities of the Punjab.

On retirement he settled down in Lahore on the advice of Maulana Mohammad Ali and devoted himself to the cause of Islam.

He was a regular contributor for thirty years to Paigham-i Sulh, the Urdu periodical of the Lahore Ahmadiyya Movement. He is famous for his commentary of the 30th and 27th part of the Quran entitled Anwarul Quran and also for his three volume comprehensive biography, in Urdu, Mujaddid-i Azam, of Mirza Ghulam Ahmad, the founder of the Ahmadiyya Movement.

Prominent Publications by Dr. Basharat Ahmad:

 Anwaar-ul-Quran - Commentary, in Urdu, of Part 27 and 30 of the Quran 
 Birth of Jesus — In the Light of the Quran AND In the Light of the Gospels 
 The Great Mujaddid (Mujaddid-e-Azam) — 3 Volumes - Biography of Hazrat Mirza Ghulam Ahmad, the Mujadid of the 14th century of Islam and founder of the Ahmadiyya Movement 
 Quranic View of Human Freedom 
 Taqdir or Pre-Measurement in Islam 
 Bashaaraat-e-Ahmadiyya (3 Volumes): A Compilation of Articles on Various Interesting Topics on Islam 
 Position of Sufi-ism (Tasawwuf) in Islam

References

Lahore Ahmadiyya Movement for the Propagation of Islam
20th-century Muslim scholars of Islam
Indian Ahmadis
1876 births
1943 deaths